Heterocyclus perroquini is a species of minute freshwater snail with an operculum, aquatic gastropod mollusc or micromollusc in the family Hydrobiidae. This species is endemic to New Caledonia.

References

Hydrobiidae
Endemic fauna of New Caledonia
Gastropods described in 1872
Taxonomy articles created by Polbot
Freshwater molluscs of Oceania